Samuel John Hazo (born 19 July 1928) is a poet, playwright, fiction novelist, and the founder and director of the International Poetry Forum in Pittsburgh, Pennsylvania. He is also McAnulty Distinguished Professor of English Emeritus at Duquesne University, where he taught for forty-three years.

Early life and education
Hazo was born in Pittsburgh, Pennsylvania in 1928 to refugee parents, a Lebanese mother and an Assyrian father from Jerusalem. From 1950 until 1957 Hazo served in the United States Marine Corps, completing his tour as a captain. He earned his Bachelor of Arts degree magna cum laude from the University of Notre Dame, and obtained his Master of Arts degree from Duquesne University, as well as a doctorate from the University of Pittsburgh. He and his wife, Mary Anne, have one son, Samuel Hazo Jr., who is an American composer.

Life 
As a young boy, Hazo's mother died and he grew closer to his brother, Robert. Although their father was alive, the pair were taken into the care of their aunt, who took on the responsibility of raising them. Their aunt held education in very high regard, and due to its importance, prioritized it when raising the boys. Hazo gives her credit for instilling in him a love for learning as well as inspiring much of his curiosity for writing.

Hazo first began writing poems during his time as an undergraduate student at the University of Notre Dame, where he originally studied law before switching to English. His first few works were written at times of random inspiration or specifically for the purpose of being recognized in literary magazines. It was not until his time as a captain in the United States Marine Corps during the time of the Korean War that he began to look back at his previous work as well as reflect on his life – a pivotal point for his work. Themes that became much more apparent in his work after that point mainly include things that Hazo considered relevant to his own life: family, Christianity, war, suffering, the absurdities of life, and the mystery of death.

Works
Some of his published works include The Holy Surprise of Right Now, Thank a Bored Angel, Jots Before Sleep, and As They Sail (poetry), Stills (fiction), Feather, Mano A Mano, and Watching Fire, Watching Rain (drama), Spying For God (an essay) and The Pittsburgh That Stays Within You (a memoir). His translations include Denis de Rougemont's The Growl of Deeper Waters, Nadia Tueni's Lebanon: Twenty Poems For One Love and Adunis's The Pages of Day And Night. Hazo also wrote “When the Evening Gets Down to Cigars” for the Pittsburgh-based cigar-friendly men's club, Rascals, Rogues, and Rapscallions.

Contributions to the Poetry Community 
Hazo is very passionate about not only literature in the many forms that he has worked in, but also specifically about poetry and its importance in the world. Hazo once said that “[poetry] speaks to us personally and with absolute sincerity, like a private letter, and we nod and assent to the truth of it as we would to the mention of our very names,” in an interview with the Pittsburgh Post Gazette while discussing this very topic. In an effort to increase the presence of poetry in the public eye, Hazo convinced the same magazine to publish a poem weekly in its Saturday editions. Hazo's founded the International Poetry Forum. For 43 years under Hazo's direction, the International Poetry Forum brought numerous poets to Pittsburgh in order to “demonstrate the relevance and centrality of poetry to the general public through the oral presentation of poetry”.

Awards and honors
Hazo received a Phi Beta Kappa Honorary Membership (1976), the Hazlett Award for Excellence in Literature (1986), the Forbes Medal for Outstanding Cultural Contributions to Western Pennsylvania (1987), the Pittsburgh Centre for the Arts Cultural Award (1995), the Elizabeth Kray Award for Outstanding Service to Poetry from New York University, and twelve honorary doctorates. For his collection of poems, Just Once, he received the Maurice English Poetry Award in 2003. A new collection of poems entitled A Flight To Elsewhere was published in 2005, as was a new prose collection entitled The Power of Less: Essays on Poetry And Public Speech. In 2004, he was honored with the Griffin Award for Creative Writing from the University of Notre Dame, his alma mater. A National Book Award Finalist, he was chosen the first poet laureate of the Commonwealth of Pennsylvania by Governor Robert Casey in 1993, serving in that capacity until 2003.

References

Further reading
 Janine Molinaro: Before the pen runs dry : a literary biography of Samuel Hazo, Steubenville, OH : Franciscan University Press, 2021,

External links
Official website
Biography by Alexis M. Penezic
 Pittsburgh Post Gazette article on his decade long appointment as Pennsylvania's poet laureate.

1928 births
Living people
Writers from Pittsburgh
American writers of Lebanese descent
Duquesne University alumni
University of Pittsburgh alumni
University of Notre Dame alumni
Duquesne University faculty
Poets from Pennsylvania
American male poets
Poets Laureate of Pennsylvania